Damber Dutta Bhatta (born 1970) is a Nepalese boxer. He competed in the men's light flyweight event at the 1988 Summer Olympics. At the 1988 Summer Olympics, he lost to Mark Epton of Great Britain.

References

External links
 

1970 births
Living people
Nepalese male boxers
Olympic boxers of Nepal
Boxers at the 1988 Summer Olympics
Place of birth missing (living people)
Light-flyweight boxers